My Old Classmate is a 2014 Chinese coming-of-age drama film directed by Frant Gwo and starring Zhou Dongyu and Lin Gengxin. It tells of the romance between two deskmates spanning across 20 years. The film was released on April 25, 2014.

Cast
 Zhou Dongyu
 Lin Gengxin
 Mike Sui
 John Bueno
 Wang Xiaokun
 Gong Geer
 Li Mincheng
 Zhao Siyuan
 Cao Yang
 Michael Gralapp
 Zhang Zifeng

Reception
The sleeper hit grossed $51.2 million in 10 days. It earned a total of  internationally. Variety praised the film for its lack of artistic pretension and its clever use of truisms, which makes it stand out among other films of the same genre.

Awards and nominations

References

Chinese romantic drama films
2014 romantic drama films
Beijing Enlight Pictures films
Chinese teen films
Chinese coming-of-age films
Films directed by Frant Gwo
2010s Mandarin-language films